Events in the year 2022 in Ethiopia.

Incumbents 
 President: Sahle-Work Zewde
 Prime Minister: Abiy Ahmed

Events

Ongoing 
Ethnic violence in Konso
Amhara genocide
Ethnic violence against Amaro Koore
Benishangul-Gumuz conflict
Oromo conflict
Tigray War
COVID-19 pandemic in Ethiopia

January 
 7 January – At least 56 people are killed by an airstrike on an IDP camp in Dedebit, Tigray Region, Ethiopia.

February 
 2 March – Twenty Ethiopian soldiers, 30 attackers, and three civilians are killed in the Metekel Zone of Benishangul-Gumuz Region.

June 
 18 June - Gimbi massacre

July 
 20 July - 2022 al-Shabaab invasion of Ethiopia

October 
 4 October - Adi Daero school airstrike
 25 October - Tigray War peace talks mediated by the African Union is formally being held for the first time in Johannesburg, South Africa.

November 
 2 November - Ethiopian and Tigrayan forces agreed to permanently cease any hostilities, ending the 2 year war in Tigray.

December 
 6 December 
 Hundreds of people held demonstrations across Oromia following reports of hostilities across the region.
 Oromo militias calls upon residents of Oromia to take up arms for "self-defense".

Deaths 
 3 March – Abune Merkorios, Patriarch of the Ethiopian Orthodox Church

See also 

 Timeline of the Tigray War

References 

 
Ethiopia
Ethiopia
2020s in Ethiopia
Years of the 21st century in Ethiopia